The 1990 ABC Under-18 Championship was the eleventh edition of the Asian Championship for Junior Men. The tournament took place in Nagoya, Japan from August to 2 September 1990. Top three teams from this competition were qualified for the World Junior Basketball Championship held in Edmonton, Canada from July 26 to August 4 of 1991.

 won their first-ever championship after breezing past  in the championship match, 82-63.

The top three teams represented Asia to the 1991 FIBA Under-19 World Championship.

Preliminary round
Top two teams from each group advance to the final round.

Draw

 Group A: China, Malaysia, India, Kuwait
 Group B: Taiwan, Indonesia, Sri Lanka, Japan
 Group C: Philippines, Iran, Hong Kong
 Group D: South Korea, Saudi Arabia, Syria

Group D

Championship round

Classification round

9th-12th place match

Final round

Semifinals

9th place

3rd place

Final

Final standing

Awards

See also
 1990 ABC Under-18 Championship for Women

References

FIBA Asia Under-18 Championship
1990 in Asian basketball
1990 in Japanese sport
International basketball competitions hosted by Japan
August 1990 sports events in Asia
September 1990 sports events in Asia